Metal toxicity or metal poisoning is the toxic effect of certain metals in certain forms and doses on life. Some metals are toxic when they form poisonous soluble compounds. Certain metals have no biological role, i.e. are not essential minerals, or are toxic when in a certain form. In the case of lead, any measurable amount may have negative health effects.  It is often thought that only heavy metals can be toxic, but lighter metals such as beryllium and lithium may also be in certain circumstances. Not all heavy metals are particularly toxic, and some are essential, such as iron. The definition may also include trace elements when abnormally high doses may be toxic.  An option for treatment of metal poisoning may be chelation therapy, a technique involving the administration of chelation agents to remove metals from the body.

Toxic metals sometimes imitate the action of an essential element in the body, interfering with the metabolic process resulting in illness. Many metals, particularly heavy metals are toxic, but some heavy metals are essential, and some, such as bismuth, have a low toxicity.  Most often the definition of toxic metals includes at least thallium, cadmium, manganese, lead, mercury and the radioactive metals. Metalloids (arsenic, polonium) may be included in the definition. Radioactive metals have both radiological toxicity and chemical toxicity. Metals in an oxidation state abnormal to the body may also become toxic: chromium(III) is an essential trace element, but chromium(VI) is a carcinogen.

Toxicity is a function of solubility.  Insoluble compounds as well as the metallic forms often exhibit negligible toxicity. The toxicity of any metal depends on its ligands. In some cases, organometallic forms, such as methylmercury and tetraethyl lead, can be extremely toxic. In other cases, organometallic derivatives are less toxic such as the cobaltocenium cation.

Decontamination for toxic metals is different from organic toxins: because toxic metals are elements, they cannot be destroyed. Toxic metals may be made insoluble or collected, possibly by the aid of chelating agents, or through bioremediation. Alternatively, they can be diluted into a sufficiently large reservoir, such as the sea, because immediate toxicity is a function of concentration rather than amount. Another method of decontamination of heavy metals in the soil is using a method called phytoremediation. This method uses plants to extract and lower the concentration of toxic heavy metals in the soil.

Toxic metals can bioaccumulate in the body and in the food chain. Therefore, a common characteristic of toxic metals is the chronic nature of their toxicity. This is particularly notable with radioactive heavy metals such as radium, which imitates calcium to the point of being incorporated into human bone, although similar health implications are found in lead or mercury poisoning.

Testing for poisoning
People are continually exposed to metals in the environment. Medical tests can detect metals often, but this is to be expected and alone is not evidence that a person is poisoned. Metal screening tests should not be used unless there is reason to believe that a person has had excessive exposure to metals. People should seek medical testing for poisoning only if they are concerned for a particular reason, and physicians should consider a patient's history and physical examination before conducting tests to detect metals.

Treatment for poisoning
Chelation therapy is a medical procedure that involves the administration of chelating agents to remove heavy metals from the body. Chelating agents are molecules that have multiple electron-donating groups, which can form stable coordination complexes with metal ions. Complexation prevents the metal ions from reacting with molecules in the body, and enable them to be dissolved in blood and eliminated in urine. It should only be used in people who have a diagnosis of metal intoxication.  That diagnosis should be validated with tests done in appropriate biological samples.

Chelation therapy is administered under very careful medical supervision due to various inherent risks. Even when the therapy is administered properly, the chelation drugs can have significant side effects. Chelation administered inappropriately can cause neurodevelopmental toxicity, increase risk of developing cancer, and cause death; chelation also removes essential metal elements and requires measures to prevent their loss.

Specific types of poisoning

Aluminium phosphide poisoning

Aluminium has no known biological role and its classification into toxic metals is controversial.

Acute aluminium phosphide poisoning (AAlPP) is a large, though under-reported, problem in the Indian subcontinent. Aluminium phosphide (AlP), which is readily available as a fumigant for stored cereal grains, sold under various brand names such as QuickPhos and Celphos, is highly toxic, especially when consumed from a freshly opened container. Death results from profound shock, myocarditis and multi-organ failure. It has been reported to be the most common cause of suicidal death in North India. The very high toxicity of aluminium phosphide is attributed to the phosphine content and is not related to aluminium. Calcium phosphide and zinc phosphide are similar poisons.

Arsenic poisoning

Arsenic poisoning is a medical condition caused by elevated levels of arsenic in the body. The dominant basis of arsenic poisoning is from ground water that naturally contains high concentrations of arsenic.  A 2007 study found that over 137 million people in more than 70 countries are probably affected by arsenic poisoning from drinking water.

Beryllium poisoning

Beryllium poisoning is illness resulting from the toxic effect of beryllium in its elemental form or in various chemical compounds. The toxicity of beryllium depends upon the duration, intensity and frequency of exposure (features of dose), as well as the form of beryllium and the route of exposure (i.e. inhalation, dermal, ingestion). According to the International Agency for Research on Cancer (IARC), beryllium and beryllium compounds are Category 1 carcinogens; they are carcinogenic to both animals and humans.

Cadmium poisoning

Cadmium is an extremely toxic metal commonly found in industrial workplaces. Due to its low permissible exposure limit, overexposures may occur even in situations where trace quantities of cadmium are found. Cadmium is used extensively in electroplating, although the nature of the operation does not generally lead to overexposures. Cadmium is also found in some industrial paints and may represent a hazard when sprayed. Operations involving removal of cadmium paints by scraping or blasting may pose a significant hazard. Cadmium is also present in the manufacturing of some types of batteries.  Exposures to cadmium are addressed in specific standards for the general industry, shipyard employment, construction industry, and the agricultural industry.

Copper toxicity

Copper toxicity, also called copperiedus, refers to the consequences of an excess of copper in the body. Copperiedus can occur from eating acid foods cooked in uncoated copper cookware, or from exposure to excess copper in drinking water, as a side-effect of estrogen birth control pills, or other environmental sources. It can also result from the genetic condition Wilson's disease.

Iron poisoning

Iron poisoning is an iron overload caused by a large excess of iron intake and usually refers to an acute overload rather than a gradual one. The term has been primarily associated with young children who consumed large quantities of iron supplement pills, which resemble sweets and are widely used, including by pregnant women—see overnutrition (approximately 3 grams is lethal for a 2 year old). Targeted packaging restrictions in the US for supplement containers with over 250 mg elemental iron have existed since 1978, and recommendations for unit packaging have reduced the several iron poisoning fatalities per year to almost nil since 1998. No known cases of iron poisoning have been identified that are associated with iron mining.

Lead poisoning

Lead poisoning, also called Plumbism is a medical condition in humans and other vertebrates caused by increased levels of the heavy metal lead in the body. Lead interferes with a variety of body processes and is toxic to many organs and tissues including the heart, bones, intestines, kidneys, and reproductive and nervous systems. It interferes with the development of the nervous system and is therefore particularly toxic to children, causing potentially permanent learning and behavior disorders. Symptoms include abdominal cramping, constipation, tremors, mood changes, infertility, anemia, and toxic psychosis.

Lithium poisoning

Lithium is used in some medications, specifically to treat bipolar disorder. The level of "sufficient" medication is thought by many physicians to be close to toxic tolerance for kidney function. Therefore, the patient is often monitored for this purpose.

Manganese poisoning, or manganism

Manganism or manganese poisoning is a toxic condition resulting from chronic exposure to manganese and first identified in 1837 by James Couper.

Mercury poisoning

Mercury poisoning is a disease caused by exposure to mercury or its compounds. Mercury (chemical symbol Hg) is a heavy metal occurring in several forms, all of which can produce toxic effects in high enough doses. Its zero oxidation state Hg0 exists as vapor or as liquid metal, its mercurous state Hg22+ exists as inorganic salts, and its mercuric state Hg2+ may form either inorganic salts or organomercury compounds; the three groups vary in effects. Toxic effects include damage to the brain, kidney, and lungs. Mercury poisoning can result in several diseases, including acrodynia (pink disease), Hunter-Russell syndrome, and Minamata disease.

Symptoms typically include sensory impairment (vision, hearing, speech), disturbed sensation and a lack of coordination. The type and degree of symptoms exhibited depend upon the individual toxin, the dose, and the method and duration of exposure.

Silver poisoning (Argyria)

Argyria or argyrosis is a condition caused by inappropriate exposure to chemical compounds of the element silver, or to silver dust. The most dramatic symptom of argyria is that the skin turns blue or bluish-grey. It may take the form of generalized argyria or local argyria. Generalized argyria affects large areas over much of the visible surface of the body. Local argyria shows in limited regions of the body, such as patches of skin, parts of the mucous membrane or the conjunctiva.

Thallium poisoning

Thallium and its compounds are often highly toxic. Contact with skin is dangerous, and adequate ventilation should be provided when melting this metal. Many thallium(I) compounds are highly soluble in water and are readily absorbed through the skin.  Exposure to them should not exceed 0.1 mg per m2 of skin in an 8-hour time-weighted average (40-hour work week). Thallium is a suspected human carcinogen.

Tin poisoning

Tin poisoning refers to the toxic effects of tin and its compounds.  Cases of poisoning from tin metal, its oxides, and its salts are "almost unknown"; on the other hand certain organotin compounds are almost as toxic as cyanide.

Zinc toxicity

Even though zinc is an essential requirement for a healthy body, excess zinc can be harmful, and cause zinc toxicity. Such toxicity levels have been seen to occur at ingestion of greater than 225 mg of zinc. Excessive absorption of zinc can suppress copper and iron absorption. The free zinc ion in solution is highly toxic to bacteria, plants, invertebrates, and even vertebrate fish.

Society and culture
It is difficult to differentiate the effects of low level metal poisoning from the environment with other kinds of environmental harms, including nonmetal pollution. Generally, increased exposure to heavy metals in the environment increases risk of developing cancer.

Without a diagnosis of metal toxicity and outside of evidence-based medicine, but perhaps because of worry about metal toxicity, some people seek chelation therapy to treat autism, cardiovascular disease, Alzheimer's disease, or any sort of neurodegeneration. Chelation therapy does not improve outcomes for those diseases.

References

External links
 Dartmouth Toxic Metals Superfund Research Program
 Toxic Metals (OSHA)

Metals
Element toxicology